Vance Randolph (February 23, 1892 – November 1, 1980) was a folklorist who studied the folklore of the Ozarks in particular. He wrote a number of books on the Ozarks, as well as Little Blue Books and juvenile fiction.

Early life
Randolph was born in Pittsburg, Kansas in 1892, the son of a lawyer and a teacher. Despite being born in a privileged home, Randolph dropped out of high school to work on left-leaning publications. This did not stop him from attending college and he graduated from what is now Pittsburg State University in 1914. He pursued graduate work at Clark University and received a Master of Arts degree in psychology. He later dedicated his book Ozark Superstitions (1947) to the memory of his Clark mentor G. Stanley Hall. In 1917 he was drafted into the U.S. Army, and served until the next year when he was given a disability discharge never serving overseas.

Career
In 1927, Randolph had his first article published in the Journal of American Folklore, based on work on Ozark dialect and folk beliefs. The dialect work led to multiple publications throughout the 1920s and 1930s in American Speech and Dialect Notes.

He moved to Pineville, McDonald County, Missouri in 1919. He never moved away from the Ozarks and remained in the Ozark Mountains from 1920 until his death. He made a living by writing for sporting and outdoor publications. While writing, Randolph used pseudonyms, but never for his work on the Ozark culture.

Randolph also wrote about non-folklore aspects of Ozark society, such as music. His Ozark Mountain Folks (1932) describes the creation of a distinctive church choir singing style created by a corps of uncredentialled, itinerant choral instructors.

Pissing in the Snow and Other Ozark Folktales (1976) was a national bestseller. He published over a dozen works on Ozark folklore. In 1949 he and the poet John Gould Fletcher founded the Ozark Folklore Society.

Honors
In 1951 he received an honorary doctorate from the University of Arkansas. A longtime member of The Missouri Folklore Society, he was elected a Fellow of the American Folklore Society in 1978.

Personal life
He met his first wife in McDonald County, Marie Wardlaw Wilbur and married in 1919. He married his second wife, Mary Celestia Parler in 1962.

Death
Randolph died in 1980 in Fayetteville, Arkansas aged 88.

Works
 The Ozarks: An American Survival of Primitive Society (Vanguard Press, 1931)
 Ozark Mountain Folks (1932)
 A Reporter in the Ozarks: A Close-Up of a Picturesque and Unique Phase of American Life (Haldeman-Julius Publications, 1944)
 Ozark Superstitions (Columbia University Press, 1947); reissued as Ozark Magic and Folklore (Dover, 1964) 
 Ozark Folk Songs (four-volume anthology, 1946–50; 1980) 
 We Always Lie to Strangers (Columbia University Press, 1951)
 Who Blowed up the Church House? (Columbia University Press, 1952)
 Down in the Holler: A Gallery of Ozark Folk Speech  by Vance Randolph and George P. Wilson (University of Oklahoma Press, 1953)
 The Devil's Pretty Daughter (Columbia University Press, 1955)
 The Talking Turtle (Columbia University Press, 1957)
 Sticks in the Knapsack and Other Ozark Folk Tales (Columbia University Press, 1958)
 Hot Springs and Hell and Other Folk Jests and Anecdotes from the Ozarks (Folklore Associates, Inc., 1965)
 Pissing in the Snow and Other Ozark Folktales (University of Illinois Press, 1976; reissued 1997)  
 (with Gordon McCann) Ozark Folklore: An Annotated Bibliography (University of Missouri, 1987)
 Vance Randolph in the Ozarks (Branson, MO: Ozarks Mountaineer, 1991)
 Roll Me in Your Arms: "Unprintable" Ozark Folksongs and Folklore : Volume I Folk Songs and Music (1992) 
 Blow the Candle Out: "Unprintable" Ozark Folksongs and Folklore : Volume II Folk Rhymes and Other Lore (1992) 
 Stiff As a Poker: A Collection of Ozark Folk Tales (Federal Way, WA: Agora Books, 1993) (Originally published as The Devil's Pretty Daughter)

References

Further reading
 Cochran, Robert. Vance Randolph: An Ozark Life. University of Illinois Press, 1985.

External links

 US Library of Congress Vance Randolph Collection in Archive of Folk Culture
 Vance Randolph bio
 Review of Ozark Folk Songs CD
 Vance Randolph Collection at University of Arkansas
 Encyclopedia of Arkansas History and Culture entry on Vance Randolph
 

1892 births
1980 deaths
People from Pittsburg, Kansas
Writers from Kansas
Writers from Missouri
Pittsburg State University alumni
Clark University alumni
American folklorists
20th-century American non-fiction writers
People from McDonald County, Missouri